Michigan's 11th Senate district is one of 38 districts in the Michigan Senate. It has been represented by Democrat Veronica Klinefelt since 2023, succeeding fellow Democrat Jeremy Moss.

Geography
District 11 encompasses parts of Macomb and Wayne counties.

2011 Apportionment Plan
District 11, as dictated by the 2011 Apportionment Plan, covered the inner suburbs of Detroit in Oakland County, including Southfield, Farmington Hills, Oak Park, Ferndale, Madison Heights, Farmington, Lathrup Village, Huntington Woods, Hazel Park, Pleasant Ridge, and Royal Oak Township.

The district was largely located within Michigan's 14th congressional district, also extending into the 9th and 11th districts. It overlapped with the 26th, 27th, 35th, and 37th districts of the Michigan House of Representatives.

Recent election results

2018

2014

Federal and statewide results in District 11

Historical district boundaries

References 

11
Oakland County, Michigan